Marco Hingerl (born 3 May 1996) is a German professional footballer who plays as a midfielder for SSV Ulm.

Club career
On 27 July 2020, Hingerl joined FC Homburg on a two-year deal.

References

External links
 
 
 

1996 births
Living people
German footballers
Footballers from Munich
Association football midfielders
Germany youth international footballers
SC Freiburg players
SC Freiburg II players
FC Bayern Munich II players
SG Sonnenhof Großaspach players
FC 08 Homburg players
SSV Ulm 1846 players
3. Liga players
Regionalliga players